The Barstow Harvey House, also known as Harvey House Railroad Depot and Barstow station, is a historic building in Barstow, California. Originally built in 1911 as Casa del Desierto, a Harvey House hotel and Santa Fe Railroad depot, it currently serves as an Amtrak station and government building housing city offices, the Barstow Chamber of Commerce and Visitor Center, and two museums.

History and architecture

The Casa del Desierto station and hotel was built in 1911 by the Atchison, Topeka and Santa Fe Railway to replace an earlier one built in 1885 that burned in 1908. 

The building is a synthesis of Spanish Renaissance and Classical Revival architecture styles, with a Moorish feeling as well. The concrete frame is faced with red tapestry brick and beige artificial stone. Majestic arcades and colonnades line the facade, providing shade from the desert sun. Red clay barrel tiles are used to cover the roof. Towers at the building's corners, and those of the central projecting bay facing the tracks, are capped with pointed roofs or painted domes.

Francis W. Wilson is the architect credited by the Historic American Buildings Survey of the National Park Service.  Amtrak's Great American Stations site says that "according to contemporary accounts, the Casa del Desierto ... was designed by Francis W. Wilson of Santa Barbara, Calif." Earlier Wilson had designed the Fray Marcos hotel in Williams, Arizona, and El Garces in Needles for the Santa Fe and Fred Harvey.

The historic structure is the finest remaining depot-hotel in California, an elegant presence in the Mojave Desert beside the intermittent Mojave River. In the 1950s, the Barstow Harvey House was listed in the Green Book guide of business establishments that were friendly to African-American motorists.

The Santa Fe closed the station in 1973. Casa del Desierto was added to the National Register of Historic Places in 1975, and designated as a California Historical Landmark in 1976. It became derelict until bought by the City of Barstow, and rebuilt following heavy damage in a 1992 earthquake.

The City of Barstow obtained the station in 1990. After restoration and more than $8 million in repairs to earthquake damage, several city offices moved into the building. The Barstow Area Chamber of Commerce & Visitor Center also operates out of the former Harvey House. Other public institutions located here are the Western America Railroad Museum on the east side and the Route 66 "Mother Road" Museum on the north side.

See also
Fred Harvey (entrepreneur)
Kelso Depot – Visitors Center
El Garces Hotel – Needles, California
California Historical Landmarks in San Bernardino County, California

References

External links

Barstow station USA Rail Guide (TrainWeb)
Barstow Route 66 "Mother Road" Museum
Barstow Area Chamber of Commerce

Fred Harvey Company
Barstow, California
Museums in San Bernardino County, California
Railroad museums in California
Tourist attractions along U.S. Route 66
Amtrak stations in San Bernardino County, California
Amtrak Thruway Motorcoach stations in San Bernardino County, California
Atchison, Topeka and Santa Fe Railway hotels
Former Atchison, Topeka and Santa Fe Railway stations in California
Defunct hotels in California
History of the Mojave Desert region
History of San Bernardino County, California
California Historical Landmarks
National Register of Historic Places in San Bernardino County, California
Railway stations in the United States opened in 1911
1911 establishments in California
Railway stations on the National Register of Historic Places in California
Neoclassical architecture in California
Spanish Revival architecture in California